"Got Me Under Pressure" is a song by ZZ Top from their 1983 album Eliminator.

Overview
The song was produced by band manager Bill Ham, and recorded and mixed by Terry Manning. David Blayney (ZZ Top's stage manager of 15 years), in his book Sharp Dressed Men, described how the song was pre-produced:  Billy Gibbons and Linden Hudson (Houston engineer and songwriter) wrote the whole song and created a recorded demo all in one afternoon without either bassist Dusty Hill or drummer Frank Beard's knowledge. Linden created the bass on a synthesizer, created drums on a drum machine and helped Gibbons write the lyrics; Gibbons performed the guitars and vocals. In live performances of the song, Gibbons and Hill exchanged vocals with each alternate phrase.

Album appearances
Besides Eliminator, "Got Me Under Pressure" also appears on the following compilations.

 Rancho Texicano
 Chrome, Smoke & BBQ
 Greatest Hits
 ZZ Top Summer Holiday (EP)

Charts

Uses in other media
In 2008, it was used in  a TV commercial for Pennzoil.

Personnel
Billy Gibbons - guitar, vocals
Dusty Hill - bass
Frank Beard - drums
Linden Hudson - Preproduction Engineer

References

Bibliography
 
 

ZZ Top songs
Songs written by Billy Gibbons
1983 songs
Song recordings produced by Bill Ham